Impromptu speaking is a speech that a person delivers without predetermination or preparation. The speaker is most commonly provided with their topic in the form of a quotation, but the topic may also be presented as an object, proverb, one-word abstract, or one of the many alternative possibilities. While specific rules and norms vary with the organization and level of competition, the speeches tend to follow basic speech format and cover topics that are both humorous and profound.

Collegiate impromptu speaking 

Impromptu speaking is an individual event offered and regulated by both the National Forensics Association and the American Forensics Association, both of whom follow nearly identical formats in proctoring the event. Both organizations provide seven minutes of time to be allocated between speaking and preparation as the speaker sees fit, allow minimal notes (usually a 3"x5" index card) to be used, and provide undisclosed prompts to determine the speech's topic.

While the competitor's success and ranking is ultimately determined by the judge's decision, there are several general criteria that many competitors and judges adhere to:
 Experienced speakers are generally expected to avoid exceeding two minutes of preparation time, with some speakers preferring to use only one minute or less.
 The speaker is to create an interpretation of the prompt and use it to establish an argument/thesis that the speech will support.
 The speaker is heavily encouraged to use examples (e.g. historical events) in the "body" of their speech to support their argument.
 Advanced speakers often use theories in conjunction with examples that illustrate them.
 As with any competitive speech, the speaker is expected to offer a clear and defined structure in their speech.
 Competitors are advised to avoid giving pre-prepared, or "canned" impromptu speeches.

Neither the AFA nor NFA regulate specific speech formats to be used by competitors, however there are two formats that are predominantly used:

Two point format:

 I. Introduction (Attention getter, interpretation of prompt, argument/thesis)
 II. First main point
    A. Supporting example
    B. Supporting example
 III. Second main point
    A. Supporting example
    B. Supporting example
 IV. Conclusion

Three point format:

 I. Introduction
 II. First main point
    A. Supporting example
 III. Second main point
    A. Supporting example
 IV. Third main point
    A. Supporting example
 V. Conclusion

Editorial impromptu 

In 2008, the National Forensics Association officially introduced a new form of impromptu for competition. In this event students are given a short editorial (ideally 3 to 5 paragraphs) to which they will develop a response.  Students will be allowed nine minutes to divide between preparation and speech time.  Speakers must speak for at least five minutes.  Limited notes, prepared in the round, are permitted. Editorial Impromptu represents an attempt to return “impromptu” to impromptu speaking.  The speech should involve the development of an argument in response to the thesis developed or opinion shared in a given editorial.

High school competitions 
Typically in high school speech competitions, a competitor is given 30 seconds to select a topic from a set of topics (usually three). The competitor will then have 5 minutes to compose a speech of five minutes with a 30-second grace period. There is a general outline for impromptu speeches, it is as follows:

 Introduction/roadmap (1 minute)
 First section (1 minute)
 Second section (1 minute) 
 Third section (1 minute)
 Conclusion (1 minute)

The introduction begins with an attention-getter, the statement of the topic and an outline of the speech. The conclusion is usually like the introduction except backwards, ending with a profound statement, although a lighthearted ending is also accepted. For the three body points, there are many kinds of formats that can be used. For example, if the topic is a quote, a competitor may go over how the quote is true, how the quote is false, and why he or she believes what he or she believes. Other examples are: past, present, future; local, national, international. More advanced speakers will use formats that look deeper into a subject such as: physical, moral, intellectual; books, video, digital (media.)

However, many speakers choose not to follow a format at all. That being said, most beginners who fail to follow a solid format often find themselves lost in a jumble of ideas.

Judging usually involves one judge in the preliminary round, one to three judges in the semi-finals/qualifying round, and a panel of three judges in the finals round. Judges look for overall coherency, impact, and confidence, and usually overlook basal errors due to the short preparation time.

Past champions in impromptu speaking

Past AFA Champions 
 1979 Dwight Rabuse, Macalester College
 1980 Camille Bammes, University of New Mexico
 1981 Andy Heaton, Bradley
 1982 Kate Joeckel, U of Nebraska Lincoln
 1983 Bart Coleman, Concordia
 1984 Dave Fowler, George Mason
 1985 Bucky Fay, U of Wisconsin Eau Claire
 1986 Debra Williams, Gonzaga University
 1987 David Bickford, Brown University
 1988 Cam Jones, Cornell
 1989 Cort Sylvester, Concordia
 1990 Michael Jacoby, Bradley
 1991 Randy Cox, University of Texas at Austin
 1992 Joe Kennedy, George Mason
 1993 Mark Price, U of Colorado Boulder
 1994 Joe Kennedy, George Mason
 1995 Eric Wolff, Concordia
 1996 Kurtis McCathern, Rice
 1997 Chris Grove, Illinois State
 1998 Amir Brown, Rice
 1999 Julie Bolcer, Seton Hall
 2000 Chris McLemore, Kansas State
 2001 Bryan Gray, University of Texas at Austin
 2002 Rob Barnhart, Ohio University
 2003 Rob Barnhart, Ohio University
 2004 Jackson Hataway, University of Alabama
 2005 Stephanie Cagniart, University of Texas at Austin
 2006 Stephanie Cagniart, University of Texas at Austin
 2007 Jill Collum, University of Texas at Austin
 2008 Saeed Jones, Western Kentucky University
 2009 Jessica Furgerson, Western Kentucky University
 2010 Dan Glaser, Ohio University
 2011 Omar Orme, Eastern Michigan University
 2012 Dexter Strong, UNiversity of Alabama
 2013 Harrison Postler, University of Northern Iowa
 2014 Andrew Neylon, Ball State University
 2015 James Qian, Arizona State University
 2016 Nathan Leys, George Mason University
 2017 Lily Nellans, Western Kentucky Universi
 2018 Suchinder Kalyan, University of Texas at Austin
 2019 Nathan Dowell, Kansas State University

Past NFA Champions 
 2017: Kohinoor Gill (Arizona State University)
 2016: Jerome Gregory (Bradley University)
 2015: Paige Settles (Western Kentucky University)

Past NSDA Champions 
 2018: Miles Morton (iLEAD North Hollywood, CA)
 2017: Kate Farwell (iLEAD North Hollywood, CA)
 2016: Jacob Womack (Aberdeen Central HS, SD)
 2015: Josh Mansfield (Highland HS, ID)
 2014: Michael Everett (Chaminade College Prep, CA)
 2013: Alexander Buckley (Downers North Grove HS, IL)
 2012: Matt Rauen (Pennsbury HS, VA)
 2011: Alex Daniel (Dobson HS, AZ)
 2010: Adam Conner (Loyola- Blakefield HS, MD)

See also 
 Types of speeches

References

External links 
 Impromptu Speech Topics, How to Handle Impromptu Speeches
 Impromptu Shuffle Impromptu Speaking App
  Organizing an Impromptu Speech Using Unified Analysis

North American debating competitions